HMAS Ladava is a former Royal Australian Navy (RAN) base that was located at Milne Bay in Papua New Guinea.

The Australian armed forces operated a number of bases in Milne Bay during World War II. Australians were able to defend and keep Milne Bay in the Battle of Milne Bay in 1942. Some bases: Rabi Camp (also spelled Rabe) was attacked by Japan in 1942. At Konibirrubirru Island was an Australian Wireless Spotters Station. Main camp was at HMAS Ladava. Later the US Navy built Naval Base Milne Bay nearby and in some of HMAS Ladava camps.

Kana Kopa Base
Kana Kopa was used as anchorage for the Royal Australian Navy starting in 1942 and supported the August 1942 Battle of Milne Bay.

Airfields

Turnbull Field (No. 3 Strip) was built in 1942 and is located near Gil Gili, just west of Swinger Bay.
Waigani Airfield, No. 2 Strip  was built near Waigani on the west end of Milne Bay. Due to poor water drainage, the airfield was abandoned and not used.

Gallery

See also

Gama River
List of former Royal Australian Navy bases

References

Ladava
Milne Bay Province